Gerardus Antonius "Gerard" Cox (born 6 March 1940, Rotterdam) is a Dutch singer, cabaret artist, actor, and director. For fifteen years, he played the lead character of the Dutch sitcom Toen Was Geluk Heel Gewoon.

Life
In 2018, Cox had a leading role in the RTL 4 alternative comedy series Beter Laat Dan Nooit, where he travels around the world with other Dutch celebrities, which include Peter Faber, Willibrord Frequin, and Barrie Stevens.

In 2020, he was involved with a film which also starred his former wife Joke Bruijs. They had ended their marriage years before after realising that they were just good friends. In 2022, they starred in the film Casa Coco.

Discography

Albums
	1968	-	Gerard Cox		-	12"LP	-	CNR	-	SLPT 35055	
	1971	-	Wie Wijst Gerard Cox De Weg... ?		-	12"LP	-	DECCA	-	6376 002	
	1972	-	Vrijblijvend... , Gerard Cox		-	12"LP	-	CBS	-	S 65235	
	1972	-	De Grootste Successen Van Gerard Cox		-	12"LP	-	CNR	-	241 383	
	1973	-	De Beste Van Gerard Cox		-	12"LP	-	CBS	-	S 53029	
	1974	-	Alles Van Gerard Cox		-	12"LP	-	CBS	-	S 80462	
	1975	-	't Voordeel Van De Twijfel		-	12"LP	-	CBS	-	S 65981	
	1976	-	Je Moet Je Verdriet Verbijten		-	12"LP	-	CBS	-	S 81629	
	1978	-	Zo Zijn We Niet Getrouwd		-	12"LP	-	ARIOLA	-	25 889 XOT	
	1978	-	Ik Hoop Dat 't Nooit Ochtend Wordt...		-	12"LP	-	ARIOLA	-	200 241	
 1982 - Lucky Luke (stem acteur)
	1987	-	Aangenaam		-	CD	-	EMI	-	746 723 2	
	1988	-	't Is Weer Voorbij Die Mooie Zomer		-	CD	-	CBS	-	462 647 2	
	1988	-	Balans		-	CD	-	EMI	-	791 201 2	
	1993	-	Leuk Voor Later		-	CD	-	EMI	-	789 018 2	
	1995	-	Uit Liefde En Respect... Voor Zoveel Moois		-	CD	-	EMI	-	832 481 2	
	1998	-	Het Beste Van Gerard Cox		-	CD	-	SONY MUSIC MEDIA	-	493 145 2	
	1998	-	Andere Noten		-	1 CD + 1 CDS	-	ABCD	-	ABCD 30148 2	
	2001	-	Wat Je Zingt, Dat Ben Je Zelf... (met Erik van der Wurff)		-	CD	-	NIKKELEN NELIS	-	NN 500 203 2	
	2001	-	Dubbelgoud (Die Goeie Ouwe Tijd + De Laaielichter)		-	2 CD's	-	DISKY	-	HHR 649 412	
	2003	-	Gerard Cox		-	CD	-	CNR MUSIC	-	22 208032

Singles
	1961	-	Spinnetje ~ Schutting ~ Ganzenhoedster / Als Ik Zeg... ~ Watervlinder ~ Mignonne		-	7"EP	-	HIS MASTER'S VOICE	-	7 EPH 2010	
	1962	-	Jacqueline / De Mensenbel		-	7"single	-	HIS MASTER'S VOICE	-	45 SGI 105	
	1963	-	Wonderen / Stille Nacht ~ Ave Maria (met Anneke Visser)		-	7"FD	-	FONOPOST	-	SHOL 299	
	1965	-	Rompelmoes: Langharig ~ 't Hoeft Allemaal Niet Zo Erg / Dodemansplaats ~ Rompelmoes (met Jan Willem ten Broeke)		-	7"EP	-	CNR	-	HX 1335	
	1966	-	De Pil / En Steeds Weer (met Jan Willem ten Broeke)		-	7"single	-	OMEGA	-	35 485	
	1966	-	De Meisjes Van De Suikerwerkfabriek / Het duiveltje Van Hof (met Jan Willem ten Broeke)		-	7"single	-	CNR	-	UH 9875	
	1967	-	God Is Niet Dood / La Belle Américaine		-	7"single	-	CNR	-	UH 9927	
	1969	-	Een Broekje In De Branding / De Liedertjes		-	7"single	-	PHILIPS	-	JF 336 066	
	1970	-	Feyenoord - Feyenoord - Feyenoord - Feyenoord - Feyenoord / Ajax Is Dood...!		-	7"single	-	PHILIPS	-	6012 056	
	1971	-	Niet In De Auto / De Baardmijt		-	7"single	-	DECCA	-	6100 031	
	1971	-	Wie Wijst Mij De Weg In Hilversum / Meisjes		-	7"single	-	DECCA	-	6100 051	
	1971	-	Dat Is Geen Liefde Meer... / Tante Kee Van De B.B... .!!		-	7"single	-	CBS	-	7697	
	1972	-	1948 (Toen Was Geluk Heel Gewoon) (Alone Again (Naturally) ) / Wat Jammer Toch Dat Alles Altijd Overgaat		-	7"single	-	CBS	-	8452	
	1973	-	't Is Weer Voorbij, Die Mooie Zomer (City Of New Orleans) / Zullen We Ritselen?		-	7"single	-	CBS	-	1784	 (#1 on the Dutch Top 40 for 5 weeks, based on "City Of New Orleans")
	1973	-	Morgen Wordt Het Beter (New World In The Morning) / Onze Linda (Permissive Twit)		-	7"single	-	CBS	-	1341	
	1974	-	Die Goeie Ouwe Tijd (Darauf Ein Glas) (A La Santé D'hier) / Echt Waar... (What Could Be Nicer)		-	7"single	-	CBS	-	2354	
	1975	-	Een Mooi Verhaal (Une Belle Histoire) / Wie Wil? (We Will)		-	7"single	-	CBS	-	3827	
	1976	-	Je Moet Je Verdriet Verbijten (Ça Va Pas Changer Le Monde) / Fantasieën Van Een Vader (Les Mesonges D'un Pere A Son Fils)		-	7"single	-	CBS	-	4549	
	1977	-	Leip Doen Op Het Leipenbal (Freakin' At The Freakers Ball) / De Grote Schoonmaak		-	7"single	-	CBS	-	4999	
	1978	-	Chrisje / Zo'n Regel		-	7"single	-	ARIOLA	-	15 504 AT	
	1978	-	Pijn Is 'n Souvenir / Later		-	7"single	-	ARIOLA	-	15 742 AT	
	1978	-	Ik Hoop Dat 't Nooit Ochtend Wordt... / Weinig Tot Niets		-	7"single	-	ARIOLA	-	100 064	
	1979	-	Ik Sta Zo Weer Klaar Met M'n Bagage (Que Sont Devenues Mes Amours?) / Kinderen!		-	7"single	-	ARIOLA	-	101 064	
	1986	-	Neem De Metro, Mama! / Ben Je In Rotterdam Geboren		-	7"single	-	START	-	083/048	
	1986	-	Die Laaielichter (Snowbird) / Toch Hou Ik Van Je, Rotterdam		-	7"single	-	EMI	-	1C 006 127392 7	
	1987	-	Effe Eentje Tussendoor / De Hoekse Waard		-	7"single	-	EMI	-	1C 006 127415 7	
	1987	-	Zo'n Lekkere Strakke Blonde Meid Op 'n Racefiets / Hoe Lang Nog, Liefje?		-	7"single	-	EMI	-	1C 006 127429 7	
	1988	-	'n Lekker Hollands Liedje / Liedje Van De Liefde		-	7"single	-	EMI	-	1C 006 127464 7	
	1988	-	Bram Vingerling / Als Ik Later Doodga		-	7"single	-	EMI	-	1C 006 127500 7	
	1989	-	Op 'n Hoge Zwarte Fiets / Jij Kan Ongelofelijk Liegen		-	7"single	-	EMI	-	1C 006 127481 7	
	1990	-	Fijn D'r Vandoor In M'n Automobiel / Verkeer(d)		-	7"single	-	EMI	-	1C 006 127527 7	
	1993	-	Met Z'n Tweeën (met Robert Long) ~ Want Het Is Niet Goed		-	CDS	-	EMI	-	872 018 2	
	1995	-	Greetje Met De Mandolien (Live) ~ Relativeren		-	CDS	-	EMI	-	720 692 2	
	1998	-	Nooit Meer Verkering ~ Ik Wil Van Je Af		-	CDS	-	ABCD	-	ABCD 30176 3	
	1999	-	Ik Wil Vanavond Met Je Vrijen ~ Luduvudu		-	CDS	-	ABCD	-	ABCD 30188 3	
	2000	-	Toen Kwam Jij ~ Kermis		-	CDS	-	ABCD	-	ABCD 30277 3

References

External links
Official Website

1940 births
Living people
Entertainers from Rotterdam
Dutch male comedians
Dutch cabaret performers
Dutch male film actors
Dutch male singers
Dutch male television actors
Actors from Rotterdam
Musicians from Rotterdam